Rocksteddy is a Filipino rock band signed to 12 Stone Records.

History and singles 
Formerly known as Acoustic Faith, Rocksteddy was founded in March 2003 by fellow church members, a trio of Christian rockers including singer Teddy Corpuz, drummer Jeff Cucullo, and rhythm guitar Howie Ramos. In 2005, they decided to drop the Christian lyricism and acoustic style and turned to alternative rock. Corpuz however did not drop the spoken word element of their former music, which became the signature sound of Rocksteddy. The band opened 2006 with the release of their debut album Tsubtsatagilidakeyn. It features the hits "Lagi Mo Na Lang Akong Dinededma," "Gising Na," and the Close Up single "Smile at Me." They also provided the theme song, "Superhero," for the ABS-CBN fantasy show Super Inggo and contributed to the "Kami nAPO Muna: Tribute to the APO Hiking Society" album with a cover of "Blue Jeans". They became part of the Manila sound tribute album, "Hopia, Mani, Popcorn", with their rendition of the Juan dela Cruz song, "No Touch".

Teddy Corpuz is a cousin of TV reporter, host and radio anchor Niña Corpuz-Rodriguez.

In 2007, the band launched their second album with their single, "Break Na Tayo".

In 2009, Rocksteddy launched their third album, Ayos Lang Ako, now under PolyEast Records, with their single "Boy Kulot".

In 2013, Rocksteddy released Instadramatic, now with Universal Records alongside their single, "Matutunan Mo Rin", the concept of the album cover was a similar to the Instagram logo.

In 2014, Rocksteddy launched their fourth album Kinagat Ng Seven Lions, via Universal Records, with their new single "Sa Panaginip".

Band members

Current
Teddy Corpuz – lead vocals
Jeff Cucullo – drums, percussion
Christian Sindico – bass guitar, backing vocals
Juven Pelingon – lead guitars, rhythm guitar

Former
Howie Ramos – rhythm guitar
Alfie Guttierez – drums

Discography
Tsubtsatagilidakeyn is Rocksteddy's debut album released on January 6, 2006 which made a hit out of "Lagi Mo Na Lang Akong Dinededma". Tsubtsatagilidakeyn is a popular phrase Filipino children would blurt out playing 'Teks', a card game where the correct side of a flipped card wins. In the same year, Rocksteddy was also invited to join the tribute album Kami nAPO muna doing their version of Apo Hiking Society's "Blue Jeans". Another tribute album followed, The Best of Manila Sound: Hopia Mani Popcorn, this time they did "No Touch" by the Juan Dela Cruz Band.

In 2007, Rocksteddy released EP album – dubbed a "maxi" album by Corpuz — Patipatopanabla, which contained their hit songs from different projects. It includes “Superhero”, the TV soundtrack to ABS-CBN's series Super Inggo, starring Makisig Morales. The album also included the band's music videos.

Rocksteddy returned with a new album in 2008 with Ayos Lang Ako, which they recorded at musician Vic Mercado's (formerly of band Bamboo) house and co-produced with Lean Ansing, guitarist of metalcore band Slapshock.

While working on their fourth album, Rocksteddy released the single "Matutuhan Mo Rin", a love song about a guy who is willing to wait for a girl to feel the same for him. Corpuz directed its music video which stars actors Jason Abalos and Maan Marquez.

Albums

Studio albums
Tsubtsatagilidakeyn (released by 12 Stone and Sony Music on January 26, 2006)
Patipatopanabla (released by 12 Stone and Sony Music in 2007)
Ayos Lang Ako (released by 12 Stone and PolyEast Records in 2008)
Kinagat Ng Seven Lions (released by 12 Stone and Universal Records in 2014)

EPs
Instadramatic (released by 12 Stone and Universal Records in 2013)

Collaborations
Kami nAPO Muna (Universal Records, 2006)
The Best Of Manila Sound: Hopia Mani Popcorn (Viva Records, 2006)
60 Taon Ng Musika At Soap Opera (Star Music, 2010)
I-Star 15: The Best Of Alternative & Rock Songs (Star Music, 2010)

Music videos and singles
Lagi Mo Na Lang Akong Dinededma (first funny music video)
Gising Na
Blue Jeans (Original by APO; taken from the tribute compilation album Kami nAPO muna)
Superhero (Super Inggo TV soundtrack)
Magpakailanman
No Touch (Original by Mike Hanopol; taken from the tribute compilation album The Best of Manila Sound: Hopia Mani Popcorn Directed by: Topel Lee)
Bale wala
Wag na lang
Kung wala na tayo
Tara
Playing safe
Impossible
Super nova
Non-stop Summer
Break na Tayo
Kung Fu Fighting feat. Gloc 9 (Kung Fu Kids TV soundtrack)
Ka-Blog (Theme from Ka-Blog TV Show)
Boy Kulot (second funny music video)
Smile At Me (Close up Commercial)
Leslie
Skulin Bukulin
Love is Your Bullet
Matutuhan Mo Rin
Sama-Sama
Right By Your Side
Pagkakataon
Drown
Sa Panaginip
Katol
U.T.I (Umasa Tapos Iniwan) (2017)
No Label (2019)

Styles and influences
Rocksteddy is classified under the hard rock, pop punk and alternative rock genres. Their music contains influences from metal, post-grunge, and punk rock, on 2015 single "Katol" they use rapping.

Other projects
Rocksteddy's lead singer Teddy Corpuz is also an actor and host, currently seen in ABS-CBN's hit noontime show “It's Showtime”. He has appeared in commercials for Globe and TV shows such as GMA's “Sugo” and TV5's “Shock Attack”.  Corpuz is also an actor on a Holy Week Drama Special on It's Showtime held every Holy Week of every year.

Awards and nominations

References

Filipino hard rock musical groups
Pop punk groups
Filipino alternative rock groups
Musical groups established in 2003
Musical groups from Metro Manila